Rangi Kuīni Wikitōria Topeora (?–1865-1873?) was a notable New Zealand tribal leader, peacemaker and composer of waiata. Of Māori descent, she identified with the Ngati Toa iwi. She was born in Kawhia, King Country, New Zealand. She was baptized at Ōtaki on 2 May 1847, no name would satisfy her but Te Kuini (the Queen); one of her husbands was given the name Arapeta (Albert), after Queen Victoria's consort. Later she was commonly known as the 'Queen of the South'.

Topeora signed the Treaty of Waitangi in Kapiti on 14 May 1840.

References

Year of death uncertain
Ngāti Toa people
Signatories of the Treaty of Waitangi
New Zealand pacifists
New Zealand singer-songwriters
New Zealand Māori musicians
Year of birth unknown
19th-century New Zealand people